Ananya Chatterjee is an Indian actress who works in Bengali films. Known for her role in Abahoman which won her a National Award. She started her career as a TV actress. She acted in several TV serials and films, including three directed by Anjan Dutt. Her role as the muse of a married director in Abahoman, directed by Rituparno Ghosh, won her the National Film Award for Best Actress.

Early life and education
Brought up in Kolkata, Chatterjee underwent education at G. D. Birla Centre and passed Class 10 board exams in 1994. Chatterjee studied microbiology  at Jogamaya Devi College, an affiliated undergraduate women's college of the University of Calcutta.

Career
Chatterjee was a student in Mamata Shankar's dance institution, when she started her acting career on television, with the TV series Din Pratidin where she acted opposite Rudranil Ghosh, and went to on appear on soap operas like Tithir Atithi, Aleya, and Ananya. Despite having no formal training in acting, her work was appreciated and she became a household name; soon appearing in three telefilms directed by Anjan Dutt, John Johnny Janardan, Ek Din Darjeeling and Amar Baba. Subsequently, she made her feature film debut with Sharan Dutta's thriller Raat Barota Paanch (2005). After appearing in the comedy Aamra (2006) by Mainak Bhaumik, her next important film was debutant director Agnidev Chatterjee's, Probhu Nashto Hoye Jai (Lord, Let the Devil Steal My Soul), which premiered at the 13th Kolkata Film Festival.

In 2009, appearing opposite veteran Soumitra Chatterjee in Suman Ghosh's Dwando she managed to stand her ground and then in Anup Sengupta's Mama Bhagne (2009) where again her performance was reviewed as "stellar". However, it was in Rituparno Ghosh's Abohoman, released in 2010, that established her as an actress of repute, winning her first National Film Award for Best Actress. In the 2012 Bengali film Meghe Dhaka Tara directed by Kamaleswar Mukherjee, Chatterjee played the role of Durga, wife of Nilkantha Bagchi.

She performed the lead role in the popular Bengali serial Subarnolata airing on Zee Bangla.

Works

Films

Television

Serials
Chena Mukher Sari 
Din Pratidin
Tithir Atithi
Aleya
Manik
Ananya
Banhisikha
Dhyatterika (Zee Bangla)
Gaaner Oparey (Star Jalsha)
Kon se Alor sopno niye
Nana Ronger Dinguli
Purbopurush
Kokhono Megh kokhono brishti (ETV Bangla)
Ashombhob(Zee Bangla) 
Subarnalata (Zee Bangla) ((Main Role))
Jay Kali Kalkattawali (Star Jalsha) (Main Role)
 New serial coming soon(Name not decided) will air on (Zee Bangla) (2022)

Reality shows
Ritur Mela Jhum Tara Ra Ra (ETV Bangla) (Celebrity Dance  Participant & Winner) 
Dance Bangla Dance Junior (Zee Bangla) (Judge)
Shrimati Champion (Colors Bangla) (Host)

Telefilms
John Johnny Janardan
Ek Din Darjeeling
Amar Baba
Nir Bhangeni
Akasher Khoje
Spandan
Duoranir Sadh
Anahuto Atithi
Bhalobaso
Sopner naam Bhalobasa
Amar Praner pore
Hoyto Tomari jonno
Gopono Kathati
Ichamoti
Sondhebelar Alo
July
Sukh
Aparichito
Sudhu Eka
Onno Bhalobasa
Proshthan Porbo
Balyobondhu
Prempotro
Sonkromon
Ektuku Icche
Jongoler Chitronattyo
Devdas-Paro

Short films
 Dheu (2000)
 Debi (2015)
 Dui Shalik (2020)

Audio drama
No Solution (2019)

Web series
 Mohomaya (2021)
 Murder By The Sea  (2022)
 Kata (Based on Narayan Sanyal's detective novel "Katay Katay") (Upcoming) for ZEE5

Awards

National Film Award for Best Actress 2010 for Abohomaan Won, Zee Bangla Gourab Samman for Best Actress (Cinema) 2011 - for Abohoman 
Won, Zee Bangla Gourab Samman for Best Actress (TV) 2011 - for Subarnalata 
Won, Anandalok Puraskar 2011 for Best Actress (TV) - for Subarnalata
Nominated, Filmfare Award 2013 for Best Actor (Female) – Bengali for Meghe Dhakha TaraWon,Tele Samman Award 2013 for Meghe Dhaka TaraWon,Tele Samman Award for Most Popular Actress (2018) - for Jai Kali KalkattawaliWon, Star Jalsha Parivar Awards 2018 for Priyo Notun Sodoshyo (Mohila) - for Jai Kali Kalkattawali
Nominated, Star Jalsha Parivar Awards 2018 for Priyo Bou - for Jai Kali KalkattawaliNominated, Anandalok Puraskar 2022 for Best Actress (OTT) - for MohomayaWon,Outstanding First Appearance Award on Hoichoi (Female) 2022 - for MohomayaReferences

External links

Change is the Constant at The Times of India''

Living people
Actresses in Bengali cinema
Actresses from Kolkata
Best Actress National Film Award winners
Jogamaya Devi College alumni
University of Calcutta alumni
Bengali television actresses
Indian film actresses
Indian television actresses
21st-century Indian actresses
Year of birth missing (living people)